tRNA-splicing endonuclease subunit Sen15 is an enzyme that in humans is encoded by the TSEN15 gene.

tRNA splicing is a fundamental process for cell growth and division. SEN15 is a subunit of the tRNA splicing endonuclease, which catalyzes the removal of introns, the first step in tRNA splicing (Paushkin et al., 2004).[supplied by OMIM]

Interactions 

C1orf19 has been shown to interact with TSEN2.

References

Further reading